The 1941 U.S. National Championships (now known as the US Open) was a tennis tournament that took place on the outdoor grass courts at the West Side Tennis Club, Forest Hills in New York City, United States. The tournament ran from 30 August until 7 September. It was the 61st staging of the U.S. National Championships and due to World War II it was the only Grand Slam tennis event of the year.

Finals

Men's singles

 Bobby Riggs defeated  Frank Kovacs  5–7, 6–1, 6–3, 6–3

Women's singles

 Sarah Palfrey Cooke defeated  Pauline Betz  7–5, 6–2

Men's doubles
 Jack Kramer /  Ted Schroeder defeated  Wayne Sabin /  Gardnar Mulloy 9–7, 6–4, 6–2

Women's doubles
 Sarah Palfrey Cooke /  Margaret Osborne defeated  Dorothy Bundy /  Pauline Betz 3–6, 6–1, 6–4

Mixed doubles
 Sarah Palfrey Cooke /   Jack Kramer defeated  Pauline Betz /  Bobby Riggs 4–6, 6–4, 6–4

References

External links
Official US Open website

 
U.S. National Championships
U.S. National Championships (tennis) by year
U.S. National Championships
U.S. National Championships
U.S. National Championships
U.S. National Championships